The Spanish Indoor Athletics Championships is an annual indoor track and field competition organised by the Royal Spanish Athletics Federation (RFEA), which serves as the Spanish national championship for the sport. Typically held over two days in February during the Spanish winter, it was first added to the national calendar in 1965, supplementing the main outdoor Spanish Athletics Championships held in the summer since 1917. It celebrated its 50th edition in 2014.

Events
The following athletics events feature as standard on the Spanish Indoor Championships programme:

 Sprint: 60 m, 200 m, 400 m
 Distance track events: 800 m, 1500 m, 3000 m
 Hurdles: 60 m hurdles
 Jumps: long jump, triple jump, high jump, pole vault
 Throws: shot put
 Combined events: heptathlon (men), pentathlon (women)

At the first three editions, non-standard distances of 600 metres, 1000 metres and 2000 metres were contested. A 5000 m race walk for men was introduced in 1979, while a women's 3000 m walk was contested from 1984. Racewalking events ceased to be part of the national championships after 1994. The men's combined event was an octathlon  in 1981, 1982, 1987, 1988 and 1989. Women competed in a sextathlon instead of a pentathlon from 1981 through 1986.

Editions

Records

Men 

* = No longer contested

Women 

* = No longer contested

References 

Records
PISTA CUBIERTA - Mejores marcas del Campeonato de España Absoluto . RFEA. Retrieved 2020-03-11.

 

 
Athletics competitions in Spain
National indoor athletics competitions
Athletics Indoor
Recurring sporting events established in 1965
1965 establishments in Spain
February sporting events